The Caruthersville Bridge is a single tower cantilever bridge carrying Interstate 155 and U.S. Route 412 across the Mississippi River between Caruthersville, Missouri and Dyersburg, Tennessee. It is the only bridge that connects Missouri and Tennessee. It stands downstream of the Cairo Mississippi River Bridge and upstream of the Hernando de Soto Bridge.

History
The bridge was first proposed in the early 1940s. A committee was created by both state legislatures to study the possibility of constructing the bridge in 1949. The site was chosen by the commission on November 18, 1952, which was subsequently approved by the Army Corps of Engineers on August 20, 1953. Construction of the bridge began in March 1969. The bridge cost  and was opened on December 1, 1976, in a ceremony by Missouri Governor Kit Bond and Tennessee Governor Ray Blanton. It is the only bridge to cross the Mississippi River between Cairo, Illinois and Memphis, Tennessee, though the Dorena-Hickman Ferry also crosses the Mississippi in this area. It is also the only bridge to connect the states of Missouri and Tennessee directly. Interstate 155 connects Dyersburg, Tennessee (and the proposed Interstate 69) with Interstate 55 near Caruthersville, Missouri and Hayti, Missouri. U.S. Route 412, when created in 1982, was routed across the bridge.

See also
 
 
 List of crossings of the Lower Mississippi River

References

Bridges over the Mississippi River
Bridges completed in 1976
Buildings and structures in Pemiscot County, Missouri
Road bridges in Missouri
Road bridges in Tennessee
Buildings and structures in Dyer County, Tennessee
Interstate 55
Bridges on the Interstate Highway System
Bridges of the United States Numbered Highway System
1976 establishments in Missouri
Cantilever bridges in the United States
Interstate vehicle bridges in the United States
1976 establishments in Tennessee
U.S. Route 412